The 2016 FIVB Volleyball World League was the 27th edition of the annual men's international volleyball tournament which was played by a record of 36 teams from 16 June to 17 July 2016. The Group 1 final round was held in Kraków, Poland. After being runners-up on five occasions, Serbia finally claimed their first World League after prevailing over Brazil in straight sets. The defending champions France claimed their first ever bronze medal at the World League after a fast victory in straight sets against Italy. Marko Ivović was elected the most valuable player.

Canada secured their promotion into the 2017 World League Group 1 by sweeping hosts Portugal in straight sets in the Group 2 final four held in Matosinhos.

In the Group 3 final four, held in Frankfurt, Germany, Slovenia defeated the home team in four sets to crown their first ever World League appearance. Additionally, the team coached by former World League champion and MVP Andrea Giani earned a spot for the Intercontinental Group 2 in the next year.

Qualification
All 32 teams from the 2015 edition directly qualified.
 qualified through the 2015 European League.

1 Teams making their debuts.

Format

Intercontinental round
Group 1, the 12 teams were drawn in 9 pools of 4 teams. In each pool, all teams will compete in round robin format. The results of all 9 pools will combine in 1 ranking table. The hosts and the top five ranked teams will play in the final round. The last ranked team after the Intercontinental Round could be relegated if the winners of the Group 2 Final Round can meet the promotion requirements set by the FIVB.
Group 2, the 12 teams were drawn in 9 pools of 4 teams. In each pool, all teams will compete in round robin format. The results of all 9 pools will combine in 1 ranking table. The hosts and the top three ranked teams will play in the final round. The last ranked team after the Intercontinental Round could be relegated if the winners of the Group 3 Final Round can meet the promotion requirements set by the FIVB.
Group 3, the 12 teams were drawn in 6 pools of 4 teams. In each pool, all teams will compete in round robin format. The results of all 6 pools will combine in 1 ranking table. The hosts and the top three ranked teams will play in the final round.

Final round
Group 1, the 6 teams in the final round will be divided in 2 pools determined by the serpentine system. The host team will be at the top position and the other teams will be allocated by their rankings in the preliminary round. The top 2 teams from each pool will play in the semifinals. The winning teams will play in the final match for the gold medals.
Group 2 and Group 3, the host team will face the last ranked team among the qualified teams in the semifinals. The other 2 teams will play against each other in the other semifinal. The winning teams will play in the final match for the gold medals and a chance for promotion.

Pools composition
The pools of Group 1 and Group 2 were announced on 18 August 2015. The pools of Group 3 were announced on 29 October 2015.

Group 1

Group 2

Group 3

Final round

Competition schedule

Squads
There are 21 players in team rosters. Maximum of 12 regular players and maximum of 2 liberos can be selected to play in each week. The full rosters of 21 players of each team can be seen in the article below.

Pool standing procedure
 Number of matches won
 Match points
 Sets ratio
 Points ratio
 If the tie continues as per the point ratio between two teams, the priority will be given to the team which won the last match between them. When the tie in points ratio is between three or more teams, a new classification of these teams in the terms of points 1, 2 and 3 will be made taking into consideration only the matches in which they were opposed to each other.

Match won 3–0 or 3–1: 3 match points for the winner, 0 match points for the loser
Match won 3–2: 2 match points for the winner, 1 match point for the loser

Intercontinental round

Group 1

Ranking

|}

Week 1

Pool A1
Venue:  Sydney Olympic Park Sports Centre, Sydney, Australia
All times are Australian Eastern Standard Time (UTC+10:00).

|}

Pool B1
Venue:  Carioca Arena 1, Rio de Janeiro, Brazil
All times are Brasília Time (UTC−03:00).

|}

Pool C1
Venue:  Yantarny Sports Complex, Kaliningrad, Russia
All times are Kaliningrad Time (UTC+02:00).

|}

Week 2

Pool D1
Venue:  Atlas Arena, Łódź, Poland
All times are Central European Summer Time (UTC+02:00).

|}

Pool E1
Venue:  PalaLottomatica, Rome, Italy
All times are Central European Summer Time (UTC+02:00).

|}

Pool F1
Venue:  Hall Aleksandar Nikolić, Belgrade, Serbia
All times are Central European Summer Time (UTC+02:00).

|}

Week 3

Pool G1
Venue:  Palais des Sports Jean Weille, Nancy, France
All times are Central European Summer Time (UTC+02:00).

|}

Pool H1
Venue:  Kay Bailey Hutchison Convention Center, Dallas, United States
All times are Central Daylight Time (UTC−05:00).

|}

Pool I1
Venue:  Azadi Indoor Stadium, Tehran, Iran
All times are Iran Daylight Time (UTC+04:30).

|}

Group 2

Ranking

|}

Week 1

Pool A2
Venue:  İzmir Atatürk Volleyball Hall, İzmir, Turkey
All times are Eastern European Summer Time (UTC+03:00).

|}

Pool B2
Venue:  Osaka Municipal Central Gymnasium, Osaka, Japan
All times are Japan Standard Time (UTC+09:00).

|}

Pool C2
Venue:  Budvar Arena, České Budějovice, Czech Republic
All times are Central European Summer Time (UTC+02:00).

|}

Week 2

Pool D2
Venue:  Aegon Arena, Bratislava, Slovakia
All times are Central European Summer Time (UTC+02:00).

|}

Pool E2
Venue:  Cairo Stadium Indoor Hall 2, Cairo, Egypt
All times are Eastern European Time (UTC+02:00).

|}

Pool F2
Venue:  SaskTel Centre, Saskatoon, Canada
All times are Central Standard Time (UTC−06:00).

|}

Week 3

Pool G2
Venue:  Jangchung Arena, Seoul, South Korea
All times are Korea Standard Time (UTC+09:00).

|}

Pool H2
Venue:  Xuancheng Sports Centre, Xuancheng, China
All times are China Standard Time (UTC+08:00).

|}

Pool I2
Venue:  Tampere Ice Stadium, Tampere, Finland
All times are Eastern European Summer Time (UTC+03:00).

|}

Group 3

Ranking

|}

Week 1

Pool A3
Venue:  Arena Stožice, Ljubljana, Slovenia
All times are Central European Summer Time (UTC+02:00).

|}

Pool B3
Venue:  Gimnasio Olímpico Juan de la Barrera, Mexico City, Mexico
All times are Central Daylight Time (UTC−05:00).

|}

Pool C3
Venue:  Kozani New Indoor Sports Hall, Kozani, Greece
All times are Eastern European Summer Time (UTC+03:00).

|}

Week 2

Pool D3
Venue:  Alexandreio Melathron Nick Galis Hall, Thessaloniki, Greece
All times are Eastern European Summer Time (UTC+03:00).

|}

Pool E3
Venue:  El Menzah Sports Palace, Tunis, Tunisia
All times are West Africa Time (UTC+01:00).

|}

Pool F3
Venue:  Baluan Sholak Sports Palace, Almaty, Kazakhstan
All times are Almaty Time (UTC+06:00).

|}

Final round

Group 3
Venue:  Fraport Arena, Frankfurt, Germany
All times are Central European Summer Time (UTC+02:00).

Final four (Week 3)

Semifinals

|}

3rd place match

|}

Final

|}

Group 2
Venue:  Centro de Desportos e Congressos de Matosinhos, Matosinhos, Portugal
All times are Western European Summer Time (UTC+01:00).

Final four (Week 4)

Semifinals

|}

3rd place match

|}

Final

|}

Group 1
Venue:  Tauron Arena, Kraków, Poland
All times are Central European Summer Time (UTC+02:00).

Pool play (Week 5)

Pool J1

|}

|}

Pool K1

|}

|}

Final four (Week 5)

Semifinals

|}

3rd place match

|}

Final

|}

Final standing

Awards

Most Valuable Player
 Marko Ivović
Best Setter
 Simone Giannelli
Best Outside Spikers
 Marko Ivović
 Antonin Rouzier

Best Middle Blockers
 Maurício Souza
 Srećko Lisinac
Best Opposite Spiker
 Wallace de Souza
Best Libero
 Jenia Grebennikov

Statistics leaders
The statistics of each group follows the vis reports P2 and P3. The statistics include 6 volleyball skills; serve, reception, set, spike, block, and dig. The table below shows the top 5 ranked players in each skill by group plus top scorers as of 10 July 2016.

Best scorers
Best scorers determined by scored points from spike, block and serve.

Best spikers
Best spikers determined by successful spikes in percentage.

Best blockers
Best blockers determined by the average of stuff blocks per set.

Best servers
Best servers determined by the average of aces per set.

Best setters
Best setters determined by the average of running sets per set.

Best diggers
Best diggers determined by the average of successful digs per set.

Best receivers
Best receivers determined by efficient receptions in percentage.

See also
2016 FIVB Volleyball World Grand Prix

References

External links

Fédération Internationale de Volleyball – official website
2016 FIVB Volleyball World League – official website
Media Guide – Introduction and Tournament History at 2016 FIVB Volleyball World League
Media Guide – Preview and Competition Information at 2016 FIVB Volleyball World League
Media Guide – Team Information and Players statistics at 2016 FIVB Volleyball World League
Media Guide – Referees at 2016 FIVB Volleyball World League
Media Guide – Tournaments Records and History World Ranking at 2016 FIVB Volleyball World League
Media Guide – Historical Information at 2016 FIVB Volleyball World League
Media Guide – Media Information at 2016 FIVB Volleyball World League

2016
FIVB World League
2016 in Polish sport
Sports competitions in Kraków
International volleyball competitions hosted by Poland
21st century in Kraków
June 2016 sports events in Europe
July 2016 sports events in Europe